Monel Moses (August 12, 1914 – November 23, 1989), nicknamed "Lefty", was an American Negro league pitcher from 1938 to 1940.

A native of Farmerville, Louisiana, Moses made his Negro leagues debut in 1938 for the Kansas City Monarchs. He went on to play with the club through 1940, his final professional season. Moses died in 1989 at age 75.

References

External links
 and Seamheads

1914 births
1989 deaths
Place of death missing
Kansas City Monarchs players
20th-century African-American sportspeople
Baseball pitchers